DYKC-TV (channel 9) is a television station in Mandaue City, Cebu, Philippines, serving as the Visayas flagship of the news channel CNN Philippines. Owned and operated by Radio Philippines Network, the station maintains master control and transmitter at the RPN Compound, M.L. Quezon St., Maguikay, Mandaue.

RPN Cebu History 
 October 30, 1971 - Kanlaon Broadcasting System opens DYKC-TV Channel 9. It is the first television station owned by the network based in Mandaue City.
 1975 - RPN was formally re-launched, the acronym for its franchise name, Radio Philippines Network.
 1979 - NewsWatch Cebuano Edition, a local version of NewsWatch was launched.
 January 15, 1980 - DYKC-TV started domestic satellite broadcasts to bring programs live from Manila to viewers in the Central Visayas region.
 1988 - RPN Cebu relaunched NewsWatch Cebu as "NewsWatch Central Visayas".
 1989 - RPN was renamed as New Vision 9.
 1994 - New Vision 9 was renamed back as Radio Philippines Network (RPN).
 January 1, 2008 - RPN's TV programming was changed when C/S, a cable network by Solar Entertainment, airs programs on free TV and telecasts on RPN stations, including Mandaue City.
 October 2008 - RPN's stations ultimately took on the C/S name as part of their permanent branding, and rebranded itself as C/S 9.
 November 29, 2009 - The C/S 9 name would not last, the network re-branded again under the new name Solar TV. In late 2010, it was revealed that RPN would no longer carry PBA games, due to planned re-launch to occur in 2011, with more "feminine" programming.
 February 25, 2011 - RPN was signed off for a week. However, the sign-off was only in preparation for a relaunch as ETC on March 2, 2011.
 December 1, 2013 - RPN was re-launched as Solar News Channel since the following day to widen its nationwide telecast.
 August 23, 2014 - the network was re-branded as 9TV.
 March 16, 2015 - 9TV was officially re-launched as CNN Philippines.

RPN Cebu previously aired programs
 Bantawan sa Kinabuhi (1981, produced by Galactica Productions)
 Behind Closed Doors
 Cinehouse 9 (1971–1982)
 Faces
 Free to Choose (1982)
 God's Miracle Hour
 Isyu ug Tubag (1979–1980)
 Maayong Buntag Sugbo (1979–1980)
 NewsWatch Cebuano Edition (1980–1988)
 NewsWatch Central Visayas (1988–2012)
 Pan sa Kinabuhi (2000–2008)
 Question Hour (1983–1985, produced by Bulwanon Productions)
 TV Eskwela

Area of coverage
 Cebu City
 Cebu Province

See also
Radio Philippines Network
List of Radio Philippines Network affiliate stations

References

Radio Philippines Network stations
Television stations in Cebu
Television channels and stations established in 1971